Miroslav was the King of Croatia from 945 until his death in 949 and a member of the Trpimirović dynasty.

Reign 
He was the oldest son of Krešimir I and succeeded him as king in 945. During his reign, Croatia suffered a civil war started by the followers of his brother, Michael Krešimir II. Because of this, Miroslav lost most of his lands in Bosnia, and the Byzantines wanted to take back his holdings in Dalmatia.

In his time, it is known that the Croatian navy was reduced to only 30 ships, while the infantry and cavalry had even more devastating losses in the civil war until Miroslav was finally killed by Pribina, Ban of Croatia in 949, and his younger brother, Michael Krešimir II, succeeded him as king.

See also 

 List of rulers of Croatia

References

Sources

Kings of Croatia
10th-century Croatian monarchs
Year of birth unknown
949 deaths
Roman Catholic monarchs
Trpimirović dynasty